Lake Almere was an inland lake in the place of today's IJsselmeer in the center of the Netherlands.

History

The texts of ancient Romans called it Lake Flevo.
Lake Almere is mentioned among others in a life of saints written by Anglo-Saxon Bishop Saint Boniface in 753, and a deed of gift from the town of Urk.

Its etymology may be eels, in Dutch aal or ael, so: ael mere = "eel lake"

Presumably, the water of Lake Almere at that time was fresh water or slightly brackish.

A number of occurrences during the Middle Ages led to the transformation of the lake to an inland sea that would be called the Zuiderzee, which are:
 rising sea levels due to global warming known as the Medieval Warm Period.
 excavation of peat by the Frisians in West Friesland near the Vlie, a river that connected lake Almere to the North Sea.
 floods such as the All Saints' Flood (1170) and St. Lucia's flood 1287.

The name
The name of the new town of Almere in Flevoland was given in 1984 in memory of this body of water.

See also
 Lake Flevo
 Zuiderzee
 IJsselmeer

Almere
Landforms of Flevoland
Lakes of the Netherlands